Paja may refer to:

 Paja, Iran, a village in Sari County
 Paja (given name), a Serbian masculine name
 Paja (surname)
 Paja Formation, geologic formation in Colombia
 Paja Brava, a Bolivian musical group